The 2020 Westmeath Senior Football Championship is the 116th edition of the Westmeath GAA's premier club Gaelic football tournament for senior graded teams in County Westmeath, Ireland. The tournament consists of 12 teams, with the winner not going on to represent Westmeath in the Leinster Senior Club Football Championship this year due to the latter competition's cancellation. The championship was originally planned to start with a seeded group stage and then progress to a knock out stage, however due to the emergence of the COVID-19 pandemic this format had to be changed. Instead, teams were drawn into four groups of three teams, before progressing to a knock-out stage.

Garrycastle were the defending champions after defeating St. Loman's Mullingar in the previous years final. The defence of their title came undone however at the ??? stage, when losing to The Downs.

This was Caulry's return to the senior grade after at two year exodus (since their relegation in 2017) when claiming the Westmeath I.F.C. title in 2019, defeating Milltownpass in the final.

On ?? October 2020, ??? claimed their ?th S.F.C. title when they defeated ??? in the final at Cusack Park.

??? were relegated to the I.F.C. for 2021 when losing their Relegation Final. This ended their ??? year stay in the top-flight of Westmeath club football.

The draws for this years S.F.C. took place on 28 June 2020.

Team changes

The following teams have changed division since the 2019 championship season.

To S.F.C.
Promoted from 2019 I.F.C.
 Caulry - (Intermediate Champions)

From S.F.C.
Relegated to 2020 I.F.C.
 St. Mary's Rochfortbridge

Group stage
All 12 teams enter the competition at this stage. The format employed in 2019 was not used this year due to the COVID-19 pandemic, but will be re-introduced again in 2021. This year, teams were drawn into 4 groups called Group A, B, C and D. The top two finishers in each group will qualify for the quarter-finals. The bottom finishers of each group will qualify for the relegation play-off.

Group A

Round 1:
 Garrycastle 0-17, 2-7 Athlone, 2/8/2020,

Round 2:
 Garrycastle 5-11, 0-5 Caulry, 8/8/2020,

Round 3:
 Athlone -vs- Caulry, 22/8/2020,

Group B

Round 1:
 Rosemount 1-11, 2-6 Castledaly, 1/8/2020,

Round 2:
 Rosemount 2-10, 0-9 The Downs, 9/8/2020,

Round 3:
 The Downs -vs- Castledaly, 23/8/2020,

Group C

Round 1:
 St. Loman's 5-9, 0-10 Tyrrellspass, 2/8/2020,

Round 2:
 St. Loman's 0-17, 1-8 Shandonagh, 8/8/2020,

Round 3:
 Tyrrellspass -vs- Shandonagh, 23/8/2020,

Group D

Round 1:
 Coralstown/Kinnegad 1-11, 1-6 Mullingar Shamrocks, 31/7/2020,

Round 2:
 Coralstown/Kinnegad 0-11, 0-11 Killucan, 7/8/2020,

Round 3:
 Mullingar Shamrocks -vs- Killucan, 22/8/2020,

Knock-out stages

Relegation play-off
The four bottom finishers from each group qualify for the relegation play-off. The team to lose both matches will be relegated to the 2021 I.F.C.

Quarter-finals 
The winners and runners up of each group qualify for the quarter-finals. The 4 winners will proceed to the semi-finals. While the 4 losers will be eliminated from the championship, they will face each other in a "2021 Group A play-off" to decide which two teams will be seeded in the top group for the 2021 S.F.C.

2021 Group A play-off
The two winners of this round will be seeded in the Group A for the 2021 S.F.C. The two losers will be seeded in Group B of the 2020 S.F.C.

Semi-finals
The four Quarter-Final winners took place in this years Semi-Finals.

Final

Leinster Senior Club Football Championship

References

2020 in Gaelic football
Westmeath Senior Football Championship
Westmeath Senior Football Championship
Westmeath SFC